Lamberto Gardelli (8 November 191517 July 1998) was a Swedish conductor of Italian birth, particularly associated with the Italian opera repertory, especially the works of Giuseppe Verdi.

Life and career
Born in Venice, Italy, Gardelli studied with Amilcare Zanella and Adriano Ariani at the Liceo Musicale Rossini in Pesaro, and later at the Accademia Nazionale di Santa Cecilia in Rome. He started his career as a pianist (appearing in public at the age of eight) and double-bass player in Italy. In addition to vocal studies he took composition classes with Goffredo Petrassi, and later spent eight years as an assistant to Serafin, also working with Mascagni during this period.

He made his conducting debut at the Rome Opera with La traviata in 1944.  Professionally, he continued to have a major career in Europe in addition to making recordings of many neglected operas. 
 
Gardelli was permanent guest conductor with the Royal Swedish Orchestra from 1946–1955, and conductor at the Stockholm Opera from 1947, working with singers such as Jussi Björling and Birgit Nilsson. He also conducted at the Drottningholm Theatre, and eventually adopted Swedish nationality and became a Court conductor. He was a conductor of the Danish Radio Orchestra from 1955–1961, then music director at the Hungarian State Opera from 1961 until 1966 and continued to appear in Budapest up until the 1990s. He made guest appearances at the Glyndebourne Festival from 1964 (with Macbeth, which was filmed), the Royal Opera House in London (during the period 1969–1982), the Metropolitan Opera in New York (debut 1966) and Deutsche Oper Berlin. He was chief Conductor of the Munich Radio Orchestra from 1982 to 1985 and of the Danish Radio Symphony Orchestra from 1986 until 1988.

Later in his career in Budapest he was noted for performances of Bruckner and Mahler symphonies. He "showed a firm command of a work's structure and used expressive nuance with discernment, eschewing any hint of excess".

He was made an "Officier de l'Ordre des Arts et des Lettres" in 1995, by the Ministère de la Culture (France).

He composed five operas, of which only L'impresario delle Americhe of 1959 was performed (Hungarian TV, 1982), while a post-Romantic Requiem was well received at performances in Budapest.

Gardelli died on 17 July 1998 in Munich, Germany, at the age of 82.

Recordings
Gardelli was considered a specialist in the works of Verdi and he made several recordings of that composer's operas in the 1960s and 1970s, conducting pioneering recordings of the neglected early operas with record companies such as Philips and Orfeo. These included Alzira, Attila, Stiffelio, I masnadieri, Ernani, Oberto, Un giorno di regno, Il corsaro, as well as more well-known works such as Nabucco, Macbeth, La traviata, La forza del destino.

While not limiting himself to Verdi, he recorded the first complete French version of Rossini's Guillaume Tell  and Giordano's Fedora with the rarely recorded Magda Olivero. He made studio recordings of four Respighi operas with Hungaroton.  He was also mentor to several noted sopranos, including Lucia Aliberti and Sylvia Sass. His non-operatic recordings include orchestral works by G. Bizet, H.D. Koppel, F. Mendelssohn, I. Pizzetti and O. Respighi.

Some of his full opera recordings include:

 L. Cherubini – Medea – Gwyneth Jones, Bruno Prevedi, Fiorenza Cossotto, Justino Diaz – Coro e Orchestra dell'Accademia di Santa Cecilia – DECCA
 G. Verdi – Attila – Ruggero Raimondi, Sherrill Milnes, Cristina Deutekom, Carlo Bergonzi – Ambrosian Singers and Royal Philharmonic Orchestra – PHILIPS
 G. Verdi – I Masnadieri – Carlo Bergonzi, Montserrat Caballe, Piero Cappuccilli, Ruggiero Raimondi – Ambrosian Singers and New Philharmonia Orchestra – PHILIPS
 G. Verdi – Nabucco – Tito Gobbi, Elena Souliotis, Dora Carral, Bruno Prevedi, Carlo Cava – Vienna State Opera Chorus and Orchestra – DECCA
 G. Verdi – Macbeth – Dietrich Fischer-Dieskau, Elena Souliotis, Luciano Pavarotti, Nicolai Ghiaurov – Ambrosian Opera Chorus, London Philharmonic Orchestra – DECCA
 G. Verdi – La traviata – Mirella Freni, Franco Bonisolli, Sesto Bruscantini – Berlin State Opera Chorus and Orchestra – ACCORD
 G. Verdi – La forza del destino – Martina Arroyo, Carlo Bergonzi, Piero Cappuccilli, Bianca Maria Casoni, Ruggero Raimondi, Geraint Evans – Ambrosian Opera Chorus, Royal Philharmonic Orchestra – EMI 
 A. Ponchielli – La Gioconda – Renata Tebaldi, Carlo Bergonzi, Robert Merrill, Marilyn Horne, Nicola Ghiuselev, Oralia Dominguez – Coro e Orchestra dell'Accademia di Santa Cecilia – DECCA
 G. Puccini – Il tabarro – Renata Tebaldi, Mario del Monaco, Robert Merrill – Chorus and Orchestra of the Maggio Musicale Fiorentino – DECCA
 G. Puccini – Suor Angelica – Renata Tebaldi, Giulietta Simionato – Chorus and Orchestra of the Maggio Musicale Fiorentino – DECCA; Ilona Tokody, Eszter Póka – Hungarian State Opera – Hungaroton
 G. Puccini – Gianni Schicchi – Fernando Corena, Renata Tebaldi, Agostino Lazzari – Orchestra of the Maggio Musicale Fiorentino – DECCA
 G. Rossini – Guillaume Tell – Gabriel Bacquier, Nicolai Gedda, Montserrat Caballé – Royal Philharmonic Orchestra – EMI

Filmography
 Eldfågeln (1952) – Hasse Ekman's film starring Tito Gobbi (Gardelli appears as an accompanist and conductor)

Sources

Biography (in German)

1915 births
1998 deaths
Musicians from Venice
Italian male conductors (music)
Accademia Nazionale di Santa Cecilia alumni
20th-century Italian conductors (music)
20th-century Italian male musicians
Bayerischer Rundfunk people
Italian emigrants to Sweden